Bert Aipassa (born 7 December 1969 in the Netherlands Antilles) is a Dutch retired footballer.

Career
After making 23 league appearances for Utrecht in the Dutch top flight, Aipassa was sentenced to one year in prison for driving from a fatal car accident. Following his release, he played in the Dutch lower leagues for Breukelen and Chabab.

References

External links
 

Dutch footballers
Living people
Association football defenders
1969 births
Dutch people of Moluccan descent
FC Utrecht players